The women's 12.5 km mass start biathlon competition of the Pyeongchang 2018 Olympics was held on 17 February 2018 at the Alpensia Biathlon Centre in Pyeongchang, South Korea. Anastasiya Kuzmina won the gold medal, the defending champion Darya Domracheva took the silver, and Tiril Eckhoff replicated her 2014 bronze medal success.

Summary
Kuzmina was leading from the start, and was skiing alone after the second shooting, with Domracheva ten seconds behind. In the first standing shooting, Domracheva missed a target, and Kuzmina, despite a missed target in the second standing shooting, was never seriously challenged for first place. Domracheva did not miss a target in the last shooting and went on to finish second. Eckhoff missed one target in the first prone shooting and one in the first standing shooting, and for most of the race was skiing in the middle of the field. However, in the last shooting all of her direct competitors missed, and she left the shooting range in third place and went on to take the bronze medal.

Qualification

Schedule
All times are (UTC+9).

Results
The race was started at 20:15.

References

mass start